Pajares de los Oteros is a municipality located in the province of León, Castile and León, Spain. According to the 2004 census (INE), the municipality has a population of 376 inhabitants.

Tradition
There is a local popular aphorism that says:

Villages

Pajares de los Oteros main town
 Fuentes de los Oteros
 Morilla de los Oteros
 Pobladura de los Oteros 
 Quintanilla de os Oteros
 Valdesaz de los Oteros
 Velilla de los Oteros

References

External links
 

Municipalities in the Province of León